Iván Gutiérrez may refer to:
 Iván Gutiérrez (cyclist)
 Iván Gutiérrez (soccer)